Seidersville is a suburban Lehigh Valley village on Route 378 in Lower Saucon Township in Northampton County, Pennsylvania. It is part of the Lehigh Valley metropolitan area, which had a population of 861,899 and was the 68th most populous metropolitan area in the U.S. as of the 2020 census.

Seidersville is located on Lehigh Mountain, just south of Bethlehem. Its ZIP Code is 18015. Lehigh Valley PBS affiliate WLVT-TV-39 is based at 839 Sesame Street just east of Seidersville.

References

Unincorporated communities in Northampton County, Pennsylvania
Unincorporated communities in Pennsylvania